Zulutime is an album by guitarists Caspar Brötzmann and Page Hamilton, released in November 1996 through Atavistic Records.

Track listing

Accolades

Personnel 
Musicians
Caspar Brötzmann – guitar, production
Page Hamilton – guitar, production
Production and additional personnel
Bruno Gebhard – production
Wharton Tiers – production

References

External links 
 

1996 albums
Albums produced by Wharton Tiers
Atavistic Records albums
Caspar Brötzmann albums